RNF103-CHMP3 readthrough is a protein that in humans is encoded by the RNF103-CHMP3 gene.

Function

This locus represents naturally occurring read-through transcription between the neighboring RNF103 (ring finger protein 103) and CHMP3 (charged multivesicular body protein 3) genes. The read-through transcript encodes a fusion protein that shares sequence identity with each individual gene product.

References

Further reading